Fred Fisher Music Co. v. M. Witmark & Sons, 318 U.S. 643 (1943), was a United States Supreme Court case in which the Court held the renewal of copyright for the second term is not an opportunity for an author to renegotiate terms made during the first term that extended beyond the first term's length.

Justices Black, Douglas, and Murphy dissented from the decision, citing the lower court judge's opinion rather than composing their own.

The Copyright Act of 1976 abrogated this decision and assigned the decision of whether or not to renew to the original copyright holder.

References

External links
 

1943 in United States case law
United States copyright case law
United States Supreme Court cases
United States Supreme Court cases of the Stone Court
Abrogated United States Supreme Court decisions